Immediate Family is a 1989 drama film directed by Jonathan Kaplan. It stars Glenn Close and James Woods as a married childless couple who want a baby. They decide to adopt from a pregnant teenage girl played by Mary Stuart Masterson who later gets second thoughts.

Plot
Successful couple Linda Spector (Glenn Close) and Michael Spector (James Woods) have been married for ten years and desperately want to be parents. They try to conceive but are unable. They turn to an adoption agency and meet the pregnant 17-year-old Lucy (Mary Stuart Masterson). She thinks the couple can provide better for her baby than she and her boyfriend Sam (Kevin Dillon). The Spectors take care of Lucy during her pregnancy and they become close but Lucy becomes uncertain about giving up her baby.

Cast 

 Glenn Close as Linda Spector
 James Woods as Michael Spector
 Mary Stuart Masterson as Lucy
 Kevin Dillon as Sam
 Linda Darlow as Lawyer Susan Drew
 Harrison Mohr as Eli
 Mimi Kennedy as Eli's mother
 Charles Levin as Eli's father
 Jessica James as Bessie
 Ken Lerner as Josh
 Jane Greer as Michael's Mother
 Veena Sood as Admitting Nurse

Reception
Immediate Family received mixed reviews from critics, as the film holds a 54% rating on Rotten Tomatoes from 13 reviews.

Awards and nominations
National Board of Review of Motion Pictures
1989: Won, "Best Supporting Actress" - Mary Stuart Masterson

Young Artist Award
1990: Nominated, "Best Young Actor Supporting Role in a Motion Picture" - Kevin Dillon

References

External links 
 
 
 
 
 
 "Immediate Family" , review by Roger Ebert.

American drama films
1989 films
1980s English-language films
American pregnancy films
Films about adoption
1989 drama films
Films shot in Vancouver
Films directed by Jonathan Kaplan
Columbia Pictures films
Films scored by Brad Fiedel
1980s pregnancy films
1980s American films